Paraclemensia incerta is a moth of the  family Incurvariidae. It is found in Japan (Hokkaido, Honshu, Shikoku, Kyushu) and Russia.

The wingspan is 12–14.5 mm for males and 13–15 mm for females. The forewings are glossy blackish-brown.

The larvae feed on Acer species, Carpinus tschonoskii, Sorbus alnifolia, Lyonia ovalifolia, Wisteria floribunda, Kalopanax pictus and Castanea crenata. They create an irregular rectangular case and skeletonise the leaves of their host plant.

References

Moths described in 1882
Incurvariidae
Moths of Japan